This article lists events that occurred during 1939 in Estonia.

Incumbents
President – Konstantin Päts
Prime Minister – Jüri Uluots

Events
 7 June – German–Estonian Non-Aggression Pact is signed.
 23 August – Molotov–Ribbentrop Pact was signed, promising mutual non-aggression between Germany and the Soviet Union and agreeing to a division of much of Europe between those two countries.
 28 September – Soviet Union coerces Estonia to sign Soviet–Estonian Mutual Assistance Treaty. According to the pact, Soviet Union can establish military bases in Estonia.

Births
1 June – Ines Aru, actress 
23 July – Raine Karp, architect
18 October – Salme Poopuu, actress and filmmaker (died 2017)

Deaths

References

 
1930s in Estonia
Estonia
Estonia
Years of the 20th century in Estonia